The Women's 10 km Open Water event at the 2001 World Aquatics Championships was held on July 18, 2001 in Fukuoka.

The sun really did shine on the Russian athletes today at Momochihama Beach as they captured one gold and two silver medals in the men's and women's 10K events. The powerful Yevgeny Bezruchenko (RUS) crossed the finish line just ahead of his teammate Vladimir Dyatchin (RUS). Peggy Büchse (GER) who was second in Monday's 5K race, easily outpaced Irina Abysova (RUS) for the women's 10K event. Bezruchenko and Abysova are both coached by three time world champion Aleksey Akatyev.
In the women's event, Büchse added the 10K gold medal to the silver medal she earned on Monday in the women's 5K event. "I am so happy, and I can't believe I actually won. I was not in the leading pack, but I remembered that my coach told me to give it my best effort and to speed it up in the last 1500 meters. I felt that I had a chance to win when I got ahead of van Dijk (NED)." The Netherlands swimmer said "I am very satisfied.  I wasn't confident about getting a medal, the group stayed together so long and it was difficult to get out. In the last 900 meters I knew that whatever happened I would get a medal." Van Dijk was the winner of both the 10K and the 25K events at the 2000 World Championships in Honolulu, Hawaii last November.  	
Silver medalist Abysova had placed 8th in the 10K event in Honolulu last November, just one month after the death of her longtime coach. She joined the training group coached by Akatyev and believed that her best event would be the women's 5K but placed only 10th. It is likely that this swimmer has changed her opinion about the 10K event.
The 10K event has been proposed for inclusion in the 2004 Olympic Games in Athens, Greece. The final events of the FINA Open Water Swimming competition will be held on Saturday when the men's 25K competition starts at 8am and the women's 25K begins at 9am.

Results

Key: DNF = Did not finish, DQ = Disqualified

References

 FINA
 10 km results from Fukuoka

World Aquatics Championships
Open water swimming at the 2001 World Aquatics Championships
2001 in women's swimming